Keelsathambur is a village situated in Namakkal district of Tamil Nadu, India. It is one of the biggest village in population and in area in Namakkal district. It is located 20 km from Namakkal and 11 km from Velur.

The village falls under Namakkal Taluk and Keerambur pirka and the police station in Paramathy.

Prior to 1996, this village had a scarcity of water. However, in 1996 an irrigation plan was started for cultivation, in which the water is pumped out from river Kaveri with the help of motor pumps by cement pipes. The pump house is at Kooduthurai near Palappatti.

Sri Sellandi Amman temple is situated in Keelsathambur, for a group of peoples known as Vellaiyan Koottam that belong to Kongu Vellalar Community.

Veerakumra kovi is an Ancestors village God.

Cities and towns in Namakkal district